Maurie Gear (18 November 1934 – 29 December 1988) was an  Australian rules footballer who played with Geelong in the Victorian Football League (VFL).

Notes

External links 

1934 births
1988 deaths
Australian rules footballers from Victoria (Australia)
Geelong Football Club players
Newtown & Chilwell Football Club players